Cathal Ó Murchadha (born Charles Murphy; 16 February 1880 – 28 April 1958) was an Irish politician and republican.

Early life
He was born in 7 Albert Place East, Dublin, and was the third of 7 boys, he was the only one that married. His parents were Charles Murphy, a carpenter, and Mary Cullen.

He attended Westland Row Christian Brothers School, as very many future Irish republicans did, including Patrick and Willie Pearse.

After leaving school in 1897, he took up a career as a solicitor's clerk, an occupation that would train him well for the many administrative and financial positions he would take in the Republican movement.

As an adult he was very involved in St Andrew's Church in Westland Row and St Andrew's Catholic Club, at 4 Sandwith Street, which later moved to 144 Pearse Street. The location would become steeped in Republican history as it was the meeting place on Easter Monday for Ó Murchadha and his comrades in the 3rd battalion ahead of the Easter Rising.

Republican activity
During the Rising, Ó Murchadha spent the week in Boland's Mill as second lieutenant to Commandant Éamon de Valera. In a 1927 issue of An tÓglach, Ó Murchadha is credited with persuading de Valera to reverse his decision to burn Westland Row Station, on the grounds that the fire might spread next door to St Andrew's Church and also to Westland Row CBS.

Ó Murchadha was interned in Frongoch internment camp after the Rising. He was manager of Arthur Griffith's newspaper Nationality and looked after it during Griffith's periods of imprisonment.

He was elected to the 2nd Dáil at the 1921 Irish elections as a Teachta Dála (TD) for the Dublin South constituency representing Sinn Féin. 

Following the Treaty, he sided with the anti-Treaty side. He was imprisoned a number of times and took part in a hunger strike in Mountjoy Prison. He was officer commanding of the republican prisoners in Harepark Internment Camp, Curragh, County Kildare. from where he was transferred to Mountjoy during the hunger strike. He was the subject of questions in Dáil Éireann regarding his torture and ill-treatment by the Irish Army.

He lost his seat at the 1922 election, but was elected to the 4th Dáil at the 1923 general election, defeating independent candidate Sir Andrew Beattie by 490 votes, but did not take his seat. He was defeated at the June 1927 general election. He was also an unsuccessful candidate at the 1927 Dublin South by-election.

He served as a Sinn Féin member on Dublin City Council. He was president of Sinn Féin from 1935 to 1937. He was one of the seven signatories of the document which purported to transfer the authority of the Second Dáil on 17 December 1938 to the Army Council of the IRA.

Private life
He was married to Nan Funge of Courtown, County Wexford, and they had five children. His brother-in-law had founded the printing firm Elo Press. At the time of his death, on 28 April 1958, he was living at 217 South Circular Road, Dolphin's Barn, Dublin.

Grandson's protest
On 26 May 2016, one of his grandsons, Brian Murphy, a member of the Real Irish Republican Army, was wrestled by Canadian ambassador Kevin Vickers as he disrupted a commemoration of British soldiers killed in the Easter Rising at Grangegorman Military Cemetery in Dublin.

See also
Irish republican legitimatism
List of members of the Oireachtas imprisoned during the Irish revolutionary period

References

1880 births
1958 deaths
Early Sinn Féin TDs
Leaders of Sinn Féin
Members of the 2nd Dáil
Members of the 4th Dáil